Aminata Konaté (born 29 December 1968) is a Guinean sprinter. She competed in the women's 100 metres at the 1992 Summer Olympics. She was the first woman to represent Guinea at the Olympics.

References

1968 births
Living people
Athletes (track and field) at the 1992 Summer Olympics
Guinean female sprinters
Olympic athletes of Guinea
Place of birth missing (living people)